Erica was a railway station on the Walhalla narrow gauge line in Gippsland, Victoria, Australia. The station was officially opened in 1910, became the terminus of the line on 4 October 1952 with the closure of the section of track to Platina, then closed finally on 25 June 1954.

From 1941 onwards, the station also had sidings for a Forest Commission timber mill.

Erica was originally named Upper Moondarra, but was renamed prior to 15 June 1908 to Moondarra, then to Harris (after a local member of parliament) prior to the line opening. In 1914 it was renamed Erica after a local mountain.

The site is currently leased by a caravan park, although it is planned as the ultimate western terminus for the Walhalla Goldfields Railway.

References

Disused railway stations in Victoria (Australia)
Transport in Gippsland (region)
Shire of Baw Baw
Walhalla railway line